The McCleod House is a historic house on South Mills Lane in Springdale, Arkansas.  It is a  story wood frame I-house, with a projecting single-story porch on the front, and a leanto section on the back, giving the house a saltbox shape.  A gable at the center of the front facade contains a door giving access to the upper level of the porch.  The house, built c. 1866, is a well-preserved example of a once-common housing form.

The house was listed on the National Register of Historic Places in 1988.

See also
National Register of Historic Places listings in Benton County, Arkansas

References

Houses on the National Register of Historic Places in Arkansas
Houses completed in 1866
Houses in Benton County, Arkansas
1866 establishments in Arkansas
National Register of Historic Places in Benton County, Arkansas